Erik Johan Anton (Erik) Scherder (born 1 December 1951) is a Dutch professor of neuropsychology who is connected to the Vrije Universiteit in Amsterdam (VU). Scherder followed his education to physiotherapist in the late seventies after which he worked in the Valeriuskliniek in Amsterdam. Afterwards he followed the study psychology at the Vrije Universiteit of Amsterdam with a specialization in neuropsychology, in which he promoted in 1995.

Biography
In 2002 he was appointed as special professor by the VU, followed by a nomination for professor Bewegingswetenschappen (Human Movement Sciences) at the Rijksuniversiteit in Groningen (RuG). After a couple of years he returned to the VU in Amsterdam, where he leads the department clinical neuropsychology. Both universities awarded Scherder with special awards, such as RUG teacher of the year and the VU education award . Due to this he was invited to the Dutch television show De Wereld Draait Door and in 2015 three episodes of DWDD University, in which the functioning of malfunctions and diseases of the brain were the main topic. 

In 2016 Scherder received the Betto Deelmanprijs, due to his exceptional efforts in the study of neuropsychology and his contribution to the subject of neuropsychology in the Netherlands'.  On 26 April 2017 Scherder was appointed Officer in the Order of Orange-Nassau.

References

External links

1951 births
Living people
Dutch cognitive scientists
Dutch psychologists
Dutch male writers